MarketFirst is a business software product for use in marketing, offered by Avolin.

History 
Founded by Anurag Khemka  in 1997 in Mountain View, California, MarketFirst Software was acquired by Pivotal Corporation in 2002, itself later acquired by CDC Software (then called chinadotcom).  MarketFirst Software’s core product was MarketFirst, a marketing automation and lead management tool that complemented the rest of the Pivotal CRM (customer relationship management) suite.

In 2012, CDC Software merged with Consona Corporation, to form Aptean. 

In October 2018, ESW Capital, LLC completed the acquisition of the Vertical Business Applications Group of Aptean, a global provider of mission-critical software solutions, via a newly formed subsidiary. The Vertical Business Applications Group (which includes MarketFirst) will join ESW Capital under the newly formed Avolin portfolio of companies, which will continue to operate the enterprise software solutions across Customer Relationship Management, Knowledge Management, IT Support and Supply Chain Management. The portfolio of solutions currently addresses issues for over 1,400 customers in more than 50 countries.

Product details 
MarketFirst is a marketing automation and lead management software system. The suite gives companies the ability to segment their databases and profile contacts, then program and launch electronic marketing campaigns to communicate with target audiences. Content within these communications (which can be delivered by e-mail, SMS, fax, etc.) can be personalized based on available database information. MarketFirst also enables users to capture leads from these marketing campaigns by tracking click-throughs and directing message recipients to registration pages. The system can also be used to manage event registrations, nurture leads, and develop event-triggered campaigns. Its visual campaign design tools allow for the development of complex automated campaigns — for example, to send one kind of automated follow-up message based on the recipient’s response to a prior campaign.

The product’s capabilities include:
 Segmentation and profiling
 E-mail streams
 Lead generation
 Event marketing
 Literature fulfillment
 Lead scoring and nurturing
 Surveying
 Map analytics

MarketFirst claims to be distinguished by its ability to support multichannel, multilingual, multi-wave campaigns that can be run perpetually and are adaptive to recipient behavior.

Effectiveness
A 2007 analysis by Forrester Research of the MarketFirst implementation at Sharp Electronics determined that the company was able to increase the number of qualified leads tenfold, reduce cost per lead by 85%, and cut advertising costs by 28% using CDC MarketFirst. CDC Software reported that Sharp had saved more than $1.6 million in operating costs through its use of MarketFirst.

Customers 
Customers include companies such as Harvey Nichols, the UK-based luxury retailer; Softrax Corporation, a provider of enterprise billing and revenue management; online job website Careerbuilder; and luxury home builder Toll Brothers, among others.

References 

Marketing software